Nick Noble may refer to:
 Nick Noble (soccer)
 Nick Noble (singer)